Kuujjuarapik Airport  is located adjacent to the Inuit community of Kuujjuarapik, Quebec, Canada. It also serves the nearby Cree community of Whapmagoostui.

Airlines and destinations

References

External links

Eeyou Istchee (territory)
Certified airports in Nord-du-Québec